The Technological University of the Philippines (TUP) Visayas  is a state higher education institution in Talisay City, Negros Occidental. It was established in 1977 as one of the three prototype technician institutes/projects of the National Government. TUP Visayas was then known as the Visayas Technician Institute (VTI).

In 1978, the Philippine College of Arts and Trades (PCAT) in Manila was converted into the Technological University of the Philippines (TUP) and was designated as the apex of technology education. Accordingly, the VTI was placed under the management of the TUP. In 1985, the VTI was renamed the Technological University of the Philippines Visayas.

Currently, the TUP Visayas is one of the top providers of engineering graduates in the country, producing topnotchers in the Professional Licensure Examination given by the Professional Regulation Commission (PRC).

TUP Visayas is located in Talisay City with extension campuses in Sagay City and Cadiz.

Curricular programs 
Graduate Program
Master of Technology (MT)

Baccalaureate Programs

Bachelor of Science in Electrical Engineering (BSEE)
Bachelor of Science in Computer Engineering (BSCpE)
Bachelor of Science in Electronics Engineering (BSECE)
Bachelor of Science in Engineering Technology (BSET)
Bachelor of Science in Mechanical Engineering (BSME)
Bachelor of Science in Chemistry (BSChem)
Bachelor of Engineering Technology (BET)
Major in Automotive Engineering Technology (AET)

Major in Chemical Engineering Technology (ChET)

Major in Computer Engineering Technology (CoET)

Major in Electrical Engineering Technology (EET)

Major in Electro-Mechanical Engineering Technology (EMT)

Major in Electronics Engineering Technology (ECET)

Major in Mechanical Engineering Technology (MET)

Major in Refrigeration and Air-conditioning Technology (RACET)

References 

https://web.archive.org/web/20120314205422/http://www.tup.edu.ph/page.php?id=campuses

External links
 http://www.tup.edu.ph
 https://web.archive.org/web/20120426192644/http://www.tupvisayas.edu.ph/

Visayas
State universities and colleges in the Philippines
Universities and colleges in Negros Occidental
Educational institutions established in 1977
1977 establishments in the Philippines

pam:Technological University of the Philippines
tl:Teknolohikal na Unibersidad ng Pilipinas